The Carol Duvall Show is an arts and crafts show which aired on the HGTV cable channel from 1994 to 2005 hosted by Carol Duvall. It was also broadcast on the DIY Network from 2005 until late-2009.  Recordings of segments from the show can be viewed on their website.

The show is devoted to demonstrating and teaching a wide variety of crafts from very basic "cut and glue" projects to intricate polymer clay creations. Duvall's program was one of the original offerings on the newly founded Home & Garden Television network in 1994, and it has remained one of the lifestyle network's most popular shows throughout its 12-year run. She introduced many polymer clay artists to the community including Judy Belcher, Maureen Carlson, Kim Cavender, Katherine Dewey, Emi Fukushima, Syndee Holt, Debbie Jackson, Donna Kato, Barbara McGuire, Ann Mitchell, Karen Mitchell, Becky Meverden, Lisa Pavelka, Gail Ritchey, Nan Roche, Michelle Ross, and Bob Wiley who have inspired countless polymer enthusiasts.

The show also featured interviews with crafters and fine artists - painters, sculptors, glass-blowers, etc. with footage of them at work in their studios.

The cancellation of the show on HGTV caused dismay among many of her fans; whose protests might have influenced the decision to continue broadcasting it on the DIY Network (owned by the same parent company Scripps Networks).

References

Sources
The Carol Duvall Show
Carol Duvall Balances Her Life

HGTV original programming
1994 American television series debuts
2005 American television series endings
Arts and crafts television series